Aubry's flapshell turtle (Cycloderma aubryi) is a species of softshell turtle in the family Trionychidae. The species is endemic to Central Africa.

Etymology
The specific name, aubryi, is in honor of Charles Eugène Aubry-Lecomte (1821–1879), who was a French civil servant and an amateur naturalist.

Geographic range
C. aubryi is found in the Democratic Republic of Congo, Gabon, the Cabinda Province of Angola and likely in the Central African Republic.

Habitat

Diet
Adults of C. aubryi prey upon crabs, crayfish, and fish. Juveniles may also eat insects.

Conservation status
In 2017, the IUCN listed C. aubryi as  vulnerable.

References

Further reading
Bour R (2008). "The holotypes of Pentonyx gabonensis A. Duméril, 1856 and Cryptopodus aubryi A. Duméril, 1856". Emys 15 (3): 41–44.
Broadley DG (1998). "The reptilian fauna of the Democratic Republic of the Congo (Congo-Kinshasa)". In: Schmidt KP, Noble GK (1998). Contributions to the Herpetology of the Belgian Congo... [reprint of the 1919 and 1923 papers]. SSAR Facsimile reprints in Herpetology, pp. 780.
Chirio, Laurent; Ineich, Ivan (2006). "Biogeography of the reptiles of the Central African Republic". African Journal of Herpetology 55 (1): 23–59.
Duméril AHA (1856). "Note sur les reptiles du Gabon ". Revue et Magasin de Zoologie Pure et Appliquée, Paris [Second Series] 8 : 369–377, 417–424, 460–470, 553–562. (in French).
Ernst CH, Barbour RW (1989). Turtles of the World. London and Washington, District of Columbia: Smithsonian Institution Press.
Gramentz, Dieter (1998). "Zur Morphologie und Merkmalsvariation von Cycloderma aubryi. (Duméril, 1856) ". Salamandra 34 (4): 333–348. (in German).
Gray JE (1860). "On the African Trionyces with hidden feet (Emyda)". Ann. Mag. Nat. Hist. 6 (3): 440–441.
Günther A (1896). "Report on a collection of reptiles and fishes made by Miss M. H. Kingsley during her travels on the Ogowe river and in Old Calabar". Ann. Mag. Nat. Hist. 17 (6): 261–267.
McCord WP, Joseph-Ouni M (2003). "Chelonian Illustrations #6. Flapshell and Giant Asian Softshell Turtles". Reptilia (Great Britain) (26): 59–64.
Meylan PA(1987). "The phylogenetic relationships of soft-shelled turtles (Family Trionychidae)". Bull. Amer. Mus. Nat. Hist. 186 (1): 1–101.
Nieden F (1910). "Die Reptilien (ausser der Schlangen) und Amphibien ". In: Die Fauna der deutschen Kolonien. Reihe 1. Kamerun Heft 2. Berlin. pp. 75. (in German).
Pauwels OSG, Vandeweghe JP (2008). Les reptiles du Gabon. Washington, District of Columbia: Smithsonian Institution. 272 pp. (in French).
Pauwels OSG; Branch, William R.; Burger, Marius (2004). "Reptiles of Loango National Park, OGOOUÉ-MARITIME PROVINCE, SOUTH-WESTERN GABON". Hamadryad 29 (1): 115–127. 
Tornier G (1902). "Die Crocodile, Schildkröten und Eidechsen in Kamerun ". Zool. Jahrb., Abt. Syst. 15 (6): 663–677. (in German).
Valverde J (2007). "Weichschildkröten ". Reptilia (Münster) 12 (6): 16–23. (in German).

External links
Photo at Chelonia.org
Photos at Australian freshwater turtles.com.au

Reptiles described in 1854
Taxa named by Auguste Duméril
Cycloderma